Harrison Kennedy (born October 15, 1989) is a Liberian footballer who is currently playing for Mark Professionals.

External links 

1989 births
Living people
Liberian footballers
Association football forwards
Sportspeople from Monrovia
FC Juniors OÖ players
1. FC Vöcklabruck players